Estádio Aniceto Moscoso, usually known as Estádio Conselheiro Galvão, is a football stadium in Madureira neighborhood, Rio de Janeiro, Brazil. The stadium has a maximum capacity of 3,314 people. The field dimensions are 101 m of length and 68 m of width. It was built in 1941.

Estádio Conselheiro Galvão is owned by Madureira Esporte Clube. The stadium is nicknamed after the street where it is located, Conselheiro Galvão Street.

History
In 1941, the works on Estádio Conselheiro Galvão were completed. The inaugural match was played on June 15 of that year, when Madureira beat Fluminense 3-1.

In 1995, the grass was reformed, and it was considered one of the best of Rio de Janeiro state at the time.

External links
Templos do Futebol
Madureira Official Website

References

Football venues in Rio de Janeiro (city)
Estadio Conselheiro Galvao